Torreggiani is a surname. Notable people with the surname include:

Alfonso Torreggiani  (1682–1764), Italian architect
Antonio Cassar-Torreggiani (1882–1959), Maltese businessman
Austin Cassar-Torreggiani (1915-?), Maltese sprinter
Camillo Torreggiani (1820-1896), Italian sculptor
Elzear Torreggiani (1830–1904), Italian Roman Catholic bishop
Luca Torreggiani (died 1699), Italian Roman Catholic bishop